Bagata is a town in the Kwilu Province of the Democratic Republic of the Congo. It is the administrative headquarters of Bagata Territory, and is situated on the Kwilu River between Kikwit and Bandundu.

Notable citizens
Tabu Ley Rochereau, a musician and later politician once dubbed the "African Elvis", was born in Bagata.

References

Populated places in Kwilu Province